Gliding On is a New Zealand sitcom that aired from 1981 to 1985.

It was written by Roger Hall and adapted from his play Glide Time, and directed by Tony Holden. The series depicts the working lives of four staff members at a government supply office in the early 1980s.

The series was followed by a short-lived sequel, Market Forces, set in the "restructured" public service environment of New Zealand's post-Rogernomics era.

Over the course of its run, Gliding On won multiple awards including Best Comedy, Best Drama and Best Direction at the Feltex Awards.

Cast
Michael Haigh as Jim
Susan Wilson as Beryl
Ross Jolly as John
Ray Henwood as Hugh
Grant Tilly as Wally
Ken Blackburn as The Boss
Katy Platt as Raewyn
Roy Billing as Perce

Several other New Zealand actors appeared in different episodes, including Jeffrey Thomas

References

External links

 Gliding On at NZ On Screen

1980s New Zealand television series
1981 New Zealand television series debuts
1985 New Zealand television series endings
New Zealand television sitcoms
Television shows filmed in New Zealand
TVNZ 1 original programming